The Capital Beltway is a  auxiliary Interstate Highway in the Washington metropolitan area that surrounds Washington, D.C., the capital of the United States, and its inner suburbs in adjacent Maryland and Virginia. It is the basis of the phrase "inside the Beltway", used when referring to issues dealing with US federal government and politics. The highway is signed as Interstate 495 (I-495) for its entire length, and its southern and eastern half runs concurrently with I-95.

This circumferential roadway is located not only in the states of Maryland and Virginia, but also crosses briefly (for about ) through the District of Columbia, near the western end of the Woodrow Wilson Bridge over the Potomac River. The beltway passes through Prince George's and Montgomery counties in Maryland and Fairfax County and the independent city of Alexandria in Virginia.

The Cabin John Parkway, a short connector between I-495 and the Clara Barton Parkway near the Potomac River along the Maryland–Virginia border, is considered an Interstate spur (I-495X) by the Maryland State Highway Administration (MDSHA).

Route description
Except for the westernmost part of Woodrow Wilson Bridge south of Downtown (the water below is considered part of the District of Columbia), the Capital Beltway encircles Washington, D.C., in adjacent Maryland and Virginia. The two directions of travel, clockwise and counterclockwise (looking at a map), have become known respectively as the "Inner Loop" and the "Outer Loop". The route descriptions below follow the direction of the Outer Loop, starting at the Woodrow Wilson Bridge over the Potomac River, south of Washington.

Most beltway interchanges provide access to Washington, with I-95 and I-295 from the south, I-66 from the west, and U.S. Route 50 (US 50) from the west and the east are among the most frequently used. More scenic routes from the beltway into DC are offered by the George Washington Memorial Parkway along the Virginia side of the Potomac River, the Clara Barton Parkway along the Maryland side of the river, and the Baltimore–Washington Parkway (B–W Parkway), approaching Washington DC from the northeast.

Initially, the entire beltway was simply I-495, and I-95 was planned to serve Downtown from the south and north, intersecting the beltway in Virginia and Maryland. However, environmental litigation stopped the completion of this plan, and the built portion of I-95 inside the beltway from the south northward into Downtown was redesignated I-395 in 1977. The small built portion from the north was converted into a park-and-ride lot. I-95 was then rerouted (and so signed) along the eastern side of the beltway, with the I-495 designation left only along the western side. In 1989, the I-495 designation was also returned to the eastern portion, with the highway cosigned as I-95 and I-495 along this route.

District of Columbia

The beltway—here I-95 and I-495 together and four lanes in each direction—travels over the tidal Potomac River on the Woodrow Wilson Bridge between Alexandria, Virginia, and the neighborhood of National Harbor of Oxon Hill, Maryland. The Federal Highway Administration (FHWA) recognizes  of the bridge as crossing the tip of the southernmost corner of the District of Columbia, but, while there are signs acknowledging the Maryland and Virginia state borders, there are none for DC.

Maryland

Prince George's County 

The beltway (where I-95 and I-495 together) enters Maryland during its Potomac River crossing over the Woodrow Wilson Bridge, west of Forest Heights and National Harbor as a 10-lane highway with a local–express lane configuration including three local lanes and two express lanes in each direction. After crossing the Potomac River, I-95/I-495 narrows to eight lanes with two local and two express lanes in each direction and immediately meets the southern terminus of I-295, known as the Anacostia Freeway, a route that serves Downtown to the north, connecting in Washington, D.C., to I-695. This large interchange also connects to National Harbor Boulevard, which links the National Harbor with the beltway and I-295. The highway passes south of Oxon Cove Park and Oxon Hill Farm and next intersects Maryland Route 210 (MD 210; Indian Head Highway), a major north–south route from southern DC to Indian Head in Charles County, which also serves the town of Forest Heights to the north at another interconnected interchange.

Heading eastward, the beltway's (I-95/I-495) local–express lane configuration ends before it interchanges with various local highways, including MD 5 and MD 4 on either side of Andrews Air Force Base, which the beltway travels near its northern edge. (Both MD 5 and MD 4 extend westward into DC and southeastward into Southern Maryland.) Past the MD 4 interchange, the beltway turns north through Glenarden, interchanging with MD 202.

The beltway then interchanges with US 50/unsigned I-595, a major highway from Downtown eastward to Annapolis and the Chesapeake Bay Bridge to the Eastern Shore of Maryland. Both US 50 and MD 450 (which interchanges with the beltway slightly northward) provide access to New Carrollton station serving Washington Metro's Orange Line, MARC Train's Penn Line, and Amtrak's Northeast Corridor railroad line and the New Carrollton area.

Turning northwest, the beltway then enters Greenbelt Park, intersecting the B–W Parkway on the northeastern edge of the park. Just after the B–W Parkway, I-95/I-495 passes an interchange with MD 201, which connects to the southern terminus of the B–W Parkway at US 50 near the DC line. Now turned fully west, the beltway runs through the northern edge of College Park, interchanging with the access roadway for Greenbelt station serving Washington Metro's Green and Yellow lines and MARC Train's Camden Line in Greenbelt, then US 1.

Beyond the US 1 interchange, I-95 separates from I-495 at the College Park Interchange. I-495 continues west, alone, on the Capital Beltway, while I-95 turns northeast toward Baltimore. The interchange includes access to a park-and-ride lot, paved initially as part of I-95's route within the beltway.

Montgomery County 

Continuing west from the College Park Interchange, I-495 crosses into Montgomery County, entering a heavily developed and populated area. Passing underneath MD 212 with no access, the route interchanges with MD 650 near the George Washington Cemetery. After bisecting Northwest Branch Park, the beltway interchanges with MD 193 and US 29 south of Four Corners; the two interchanges are little more than half a mile apart. Southbound US 29 is the main route into downtown Silver Spring, continuing into Washington, D.C.

Squeezing past Argyle Local Park and Sligo Creek Golf Course, the beltway interchanges with MD 97 northwest of Silver Spring, then follows an alignment formerly known as Rock Creek Parkway. The route twists along the alignment, through and around Rock Creek Park, then interchanges with MD 185 near the Walter Reed National Military Medical Center. Turning northwest, I-495 soon encounters the southern terminus of I-270, which extends northwestward to meet I-70 in Frederick.

I-270 and I-495 split at a highly complex Y junction, with two separate high-occupancy vehicle (HOV) connections to I-270's HOV lanes and separate ramps to and from MD 355 (formerly US 240). The old Rock Creek Parkway alignment follows I-270 north, while I-495 turns west and enters the only other six-lane segment of the beltway still in existence; significant levels of traffic exit onto I-270 north, leaving the six-lane segment west of the split adequate.

Interchanging with Old Georgetown Road (MD 187), I-495 soon meets the I-270 Spur, the other side of the I-270/I-495 triangle. I-495 joins I-270 Spur at a converging Y junction; Inner Loop traffic exits from itself at the southern terminus of I-270 Spur, while Outer Loop traffic crosses the spur and enters it from the right. The two carriageways of I-495 temporarily widen to five lanes each until the MD 190 and Cabin John Parkway interchanges. (MD 190 provides access to the northwestern portion of Washington, D.C., and to the Potomac and Great Falls areas of Montgomery County, while the Cabin John Parkway extends to the Clara Barton Parkway along the Potomac River.)

After these interchanges, the beltway then narrows to eight lanes again. Turning sharply to the west, I-495 meets the Clara Barton Parkway along the north side of the Potomac River; this parkway provides a scenic route eastward into the western part of Washington, D.C., and westward toward the Potomac River's Great Falls. After this interchange, the Beltway soon crosses the Mather Gorge into Virginia over the 10-lane American Legion Memorial Bridge.

Virginia

Immediately after crossing into Fairfax County, I-495 encounters the western terminus of the George Washington Memorial Parkway at a trumpet interchange; the parkway provides a scenic route to Arlington and Downtown. The beltway then continues south, next interchanging with State Route 193 (SR 193) south of Dranesville District Park, then reaches the extensive triangle of interchanges between I-495, the Dulles Access Road, SR 267, and SR 123. The eastbound Dulles Access Road also provides access to I-66 for Outer Loop beltway traffic. The former interchange with the toll road (SR 267) is a directional interchange, while the latter is a cloverleaf; the entire complex occurs east of the Tysons business district.

Now running south, the beltway interchanges with SR 7 (Leesburg Pike) east of Tysons; passing Dunn Loring to the east, I-495 soon reaches the complex interchange with I-66, which extends westward to I-81 in the Shenandoah Valley near Strasburg and eastward to Arlington and Downtown. In a similar design as the I-270/I-495 interchange, dedicated HOV connections exist between I-495 and I-66, with directional ramps providing the remaining connections. There is no access between the Outer Loop and eastbound I-66 at this interchange. Instead, Outer Loop traffic must use the eastbound Dulles Access Road exit  to the north in order to reach I-66 east. There are multiple ramps from I-66 east to the Inner Loop, with one ramp exiting from the left side of I-66 east and the other exiting from the right. The Dulles Access Road leads to Dulles International Airport, which then changes over to the Dulles Greenway and ends at Leesburg.

South of the I-66 interchange, the beltway crosses under US 29 and SR 237 with no access, then encounters a large braided interchange between I-495, US 50, and two local roads; the direct interchange between I-495 and US 50 is a full cloverleaf, while the braided local interchanges between I-495, US 50, and the local roads are modified single-point urban interchanges. The entire complex is bounded on the northeast side by Fairview Lake and on the southwest side by an office complex.

Continuing due south, the route then interchanges with Gallows Road, then skirts the eastern edge of Mill Creek Park before interchanging with SR 236 southwest of Annandale Community Park. Running along the eastern edge of Wakefield Park, the Beltway turns southeast and interchanges with SR 620 before turning east near Flag Run Park and entering Springfield, meeting the Springfield Interchange with I-95 southeast of the Shirley Industrial Complex.

I-95 joins the beltway within the Springfield Interchange. I-495 also meets the southern terminus of I-395 within the same massive interchange complex.

Continuing east, the beltway encounters a diamond interchange with a connector road linking to Eisenhower Avenue, which parallels the beltway for a short distance. Skirting the northern edges of Loftridge and Burgundy parks, the two routes enter Alexandria and soon reach SR 241, a direct route into the city, currently under major reconstruction. Within the interchange, the beltway nears the western approach to the Woodrow Wilson Bridge.

Continuing east, the two routes encounter US 1, a major north–south highway providing access to Alexandria, Arlington, and Downtown, as well as various points south in Fairfax County. Finally, beyond this complex interchange, I-95 and I-495 together cross Alexandria's Jones Point Park and exit Virginia via the Woodrow Wilson Bridge.

History
The idea of building a highway around the Washington, D.C., suburbs had been discussed at least since 1944, when Fred W. Tummler, director of planning of the National Capital Park and Planning Commission, proposed an Inter-County Metropolitan Freeway. The Senate Committee on Public Works backed the idea of building the highway in 1951, asking the Bureau of Public Roads to prepare plans for the highway. Backed by Senator Francis H. Case of South Dakota, the plan called for the highway to begin in Beltsville at the nearly completed B–W Parkway, continue west through Silver Spring and Bethesda, cross the Potomac River over a new bridge, head south near Tysons Corner and Falls Church, turn east by the Shirley Memorial Highway, and end at US 1 in Gum Springs. A 1952 amendment called for continuing the highway past Alexandria, over the Potomac River on a new bridge, and reconnect to the B–W Parkway in Maryland. By December 1952, the plan had evolved into a highway that fully encircled Washington DC's suburbs. The highway was intended to reduce traffic and also to offer an alternative route for the military in case of emergency. The federal government gave final approval for the construction of the Capital Beltway (also known as the Circumferential Highway in the planning stages) on September 28, 1955. The first section of the  beltway (including the Woodrow Wilson Bridge over the Potomac River) was opened on December 21, 1961; the highway was completed on August 17, 1964.

Originally designated I-495, in 1977, the eastern portion of the beltway was redesignated I-95 when a proposed alignment of I-95 from New York Avenue in Washington, D.C., through Prince George's County, Maryland, to I-495 was canceled. Motorists never fully adjusted to the two halves of the beltway having different numbers. According to Ron Shaffer of The Washington Post,

In 1989, the I-495 designation was restored to the eastern portion, making it a dual I-95/I-495.

Traveling clockwise, the beltway is designated as the "Inner Loop"; traveling counterclockwise, it is designated as the "Outer Loop". This parlance too has led to its own confusion, with unfamiliar motorists imagining two separate, distinct highway alignments, one some distance inside the other. At entrance ramps to the beltway and on the on-highway signage, "Inner Loop" and "Outer Loop" shields are posted in conjunction with the route marker shields, although the terms are not emphasized in signage.

The beltway was originally envisioned as primarily a bypass for long-distance eastern seaboard traffic to avoid driving directly through Washington, D.C. However, the explosive growth both of housing and business in the Washington, D.C., suburbs following the beltway's completion quickly made the beltway the area's "main street" for local traffic as well. Numerous large shopping malls, community colleges, sports and concert stadiums, and corporate employment centers were purposely built adjacent to the beltway, and these added greatly to the traffic, as has the passenger growth of regional airports accessed by the beltway. The formerly more affordable price of housing in Southern Maryland versus Northern Virginia, also led tens of thousands of commuters to live in Southern Maryland and commute on the beltway to Virginia. The newer Fairfax County Parkway in the 1990s helped ease some traffic on the Virginia beltway; however, various proposals to build another complete outer beltway in the outer suburbs has not gotten off the ground because local governments in Maryland object to building additional Potomac River crossings as well as destroying protected "open space" and creating sprawl.

College Park Interchange

The College Park Interchange is the informal name for the northern interchange between I-95 and I-495 in College Park, Maryland. The interchange was partially opened, along with the connecting segment of I-95, in 1971, completing I-95 between the Baltimore and Capital beltways. As originally planned, it was designed with the idea that mainline I-95 through traffic would continue straight through the interchange and south into Washington, D.C., as the Northeast Freeway, joining the North Central Freeway within DC and running south toward the central business district. When the DC government canceled its segment of I-95 in 1977, I-95 was rerouted onto the eastern half of the Capital Beltway, which lost its designation as I-495 (this was restored in 1989, forming a concurrency of I-95 and I-495 on the eastern half). As a result of this rerouting, the interchange was placed under considerable pressure to cater for a traffic flow that it was not designed to handle.

Originally, travelers from southbound I-95 to the Inner Loop had to traverse the one-lane cloverleaf ramp in the southwest quadrant of the interchange; after exiting the ramp, traffic then had to weave through Inner Loop traffic headed for US 1. This unsafe condition was rectified by November 1986, when the flyover from southbound I-95 to the Inner Loop was constructed for I-95 southbound through traffic; the existing one-lane cloverleaf ramp was retained for access to the new collector–distributor lane on the Inner Loop within the US 1 interchange, to segregate through traffic from southbound I-95 and local traffic for US 1. The stump end of the interchange was also modified into its present configuration, and the park and ride was built.

Traffic congestion
Despite numerous widening projects during its history, heavy traffic on the beltway is a continuing problem. The Woodrow Wilson Bridge—where eight lanes were squeezed into six—was particularly onerous, with miles-long backups daily during commuter rush hours and on heavily traveled weekends. Relief for this bottleneck came on May 30, 2008, when the 12-lane replacement bridge opened to traffic in both directions (the six-lane span carrying Outer Loop traffic had opened in June 2006). Two of the lanes on the Wilson are being held in reserve for future use as bus rapid transit or rail transit.

Two intersections on the Capital Beltway are ranked in the top 20 on a study of the "worst bottlenecks in the nation". They are the I-495 at I-270 interchange in Montgomery County, Maryland, ranked third overall, which receives 760,425 cars daily, and the College Park Interchange in Prince George's County, Maryland, ranked 11th, with 340,125 cars. The Springfield Interchange, where I-395, I-95, and I-495 meet, was previously ranked fifth worst in the nation, but recent improvements have taken it off the top 20. Local commuters refer to the Springfield Interchange as "The Mixing Bowl". although this designation is reserved by highway officials for the even more complicated interchange complex adjacent to the Pentagon on the original Henry G. Shirley Memorial Highway (currently better-known as I-395) at SR 27 in Arlington.

In April 2005, the Virginia Department of Transportation (VDOT) signed an agreement with two private companies to build high-occupancy toll (HOT) lanes on the stretch of the beltway between Springfield and Georgetown Pike. Construction began in 2008. Maryland officials are considering such lanes on their segment of the beltway, as well as other major commuter highways in the state. Locals who disapprove of these projects have nicknamed them "Lexus Lanes" because of the potential high price for using the lanes in exchange for bypassing congestion. These new lanes are one stage of a controversial project to widen the beltway, with the second stage involving widening the beltway to 12 lanes; opponents have called for various alternatives to this project (as well as the controversial Intercounty Connector project) which would divert many vehicles off the northern beltway. The MDOT SHA's Purple Line light rail transit line, under construction , is just one example.

The beltway has been improved since it opened. The American Legion Bridge was expanded by two lanes. HOV lanes were added between River Road and the I-270 Spur in Montgomery County. The interchange between I-95 and the beltway in Prince George's County was originally designed to be a cloverleaf to allow I-95 to extend southward toward the District of Columbia. After I-95 was realigned onto the beltway, a flyover ramp was built to allow I-95 through traffic to have two high-speed lanes. The interchange between US 50 and I-95/I-495 in Prince George's County was upgraded from a simple cloverleaf to a hybrid turbine interchange. In the beltway's original configuration, I-295 and Indian Head Highway had separate interchanges. As a congestion relief measure, I-295 was extended over the beltway and continued parallel to it so that the two highways were directly connected independent of the beltway. However, these interchanges were redesigned and rebuilt to accommodate the expansion of the Woodrow Wilson Bridge and the construction of dedicated ramps to National Harbor.

Bridge and interchange improvements

The Springfield Interchange in Virginia completed reconstruction in 2007. The eight-year, nearly $676-million (equivalent to $ in ) project worked to eliminate weaving among local and long-distance traffic between I-95, I-395, the beltway, and SR 644.

The Woodrow Wilson Bridge underwent reconstruction in a major project that began in 1999; it now provides express and local lanes for both the Inner and Outer loops. The new Woodrow Wilson Bridge is higher and wider than the original 1961 span, which was demolished in 2006. The Outer Loop span opened in June 2006, and the Inner Loop span opened in May 2008.

Also, in association with the Wilson Bridge project, the Telegraph Road and US 1 interchanges (exits 176 and 177) in Alexandria, Virginia, were rebuilt. The I-295 and MD 210 interchanges (exits 2 and 3) in Maryland were rebuilt as well. These improvement lasted through 2013.

The Branch Avenue (MD 5) Interchange was also improved.

Virginia HOT lanes

VDOT authorized a public–private partnership to construct HOT lanes in Northern Virginia. The project added two lanes to I-495 in each direction from just west of the Springfield Interchange to just north of the Dulles Toll Road and included the replacement of more than 50 bridges, overpasses, and major interchanges.

Drivers of vehicles with fewer than three occupants are required to pay a toll to use the lanes. Tolls change dynamically, with higher tolls charged during periods of heaviest congestion. Drivers using the HOT lanes are required to carry an E-ZPass transponder to allow electronic toll collection, eliminating the need for tollbooths. Tolls are waived for buses, carpools of at least three people, motorcycles, and emergency vehicles with an E-ZPass Flex transponder set to the "HOV ON" configuration. If more than a specified number of carpools or busses use the lanes, Virginia must pay the tolls for the excess vehicles.

At the north and south terminal of the HOT lanes, motorists are able to transition directly between the HOT lanes and the I-495 general purpose lanes. However, elsewhere along the corridor, access to and from the HOT lanes is only permitted from cross roads. Some cross roads provide access to both HOT lanes and general purpose lanes; others have access only to one system or the other. Many HOT lane access points serve traffic in only one direction of I-495, which is intended to complement typical commuting patterns. HOT lane interchanges are as follows:

The original scope of the HOT project is covered by a fixed-price $1.3-billion (equivalent to $ in ) contract between concessionaire Capital Beltway Express LLC and contractor Fluor Corporation. The partnership has proposed extending the scope of the project to north to the Potomac River.

In 2004, Transurban joined the Fluor Corporation team to serve as concessionaire and long-term operator of the HOT lanes. After a competitive procurement, the team was selected to deliver and operate the new HOT lanes. After a series of public meetings and environmental studies, the project was approved and funded in 2007. Construction began in mid-2008. The express lanes were opened for public access on November 17, 2012.

Maryland express toll lane proposal

In September 2017, Governor Larry Hogan announced a plan to widen the portion of I-495 in Maryland by four lanes, adding express toll lanes to the median, as part of an $11-billion-or-more (equivalent to $ or more in ) proposal to widen roads in Maryland. The project would be a public–private partnership with private companies responsible for constructing, operating, and maintaining the lanes. On June 5, 2019, the Maryland Board of Public Works voted 2–1 in favor of the proposal to construct express toll lanes along I-495, with Governor Hogan and State Comptroller Peter Franchot voting for it and State Treasurer Nancy Kopp voting against it. The widening and addition of express toll lanes along I-495 would be split into two phases, with the first phase expanding the road in Montgomery County and the second phase expanding the road in Prince George's County. On June 12, 2019, the Maryland-National Capital Park and Planning Commission (M-NCCPC) sent a letter of nonconcurrence to MDOT SHA, triggering a mediation process with the state. The M-NCPPC has jurisdiction over parkland that MDOT SHA would need for its proposal.

In August 2022, the FHWA approved the proposed project. In October 2022, environmental and historic preservation groups filed suit against the state, citing deficiencies in the environmental review process and the projected impacts on Plummers Island. In November 2022, the Maryland Department of Transportation announced that it would not award a contract for construction of the proposed toll lane project until after Governor Hogan has left office in January 2023. Decisions on the project will be made by the administration of newly-elected Governor Wes Moore and the Board of Public Works.

Exit numbering
Exit numbers on the beltway have gone through several iterations. Originally, all exits on the beltway were numbered sequentially in a clockwise direction, starting with exit 1 for US 1 in Alexandria, and the last exit number being 38 for I-295 in Prince George's County. After the eastern half of the Beltway was renumbered in 1977 as I-95, exits on the Maryland portion were renumbered to the current format, counterclockwise with exit numbers assigned to mileposts. This caused problems because there were some exits that had the same number in Maryland and Virginia. Around 2000, this problem was solved by renumbering all of the Virginia exits. The exit numbers between the American Legion Memorial Bridge and the Springfield Interchange—I-495's intersection with I-395 and I-95 in Virginia—became a continuation of the Maryland exit numbers from the Woodrow Wilson Bridge to the American Legion Memorial Bridge. The exit numbers between the Springfield Interchange and the Woodrow Wilson Bridge became a continuation of the exit numbers of I-95 in Virginia; such exit numbers are much higher than those on the rest of the beltway but continue to increase in the counterclockwise direction. The counterclockwise numbering on the Capital Beltway is a rarity, as most similar loop highways, like the Baltimore Beltway, have their exit numbers/mileage set in a clockwise arrangement.

Exit list

Mainline
Prior to 2000, the commonwealth of Virginia reset exit numbers at state lines and numbered them from the counterclockwise end to the clockwise end.

Express lanes

The entire route is in Fairfax County, Virginia.

See also

 Inner Loop, a partly built downtown loop
 Washington Outer Beltway, a planned loop outside the Beltway
 Maryland Route 200 (the Intercounty Connector), which began construction in 2007, uses portions of what was once planned to be the Outer Beltway in Montgomery and Prince George's counties in Maryland
 Fairfax County Parkway and Prince William Parkway, portions of which are built on rights-of-way acquired for the Outer Beltway in Virginia

Notes

References

External links

 I-495 @ MDRoads.com
 Capital Beltway (I-495 and I-95), by Roads to the Future
 Steve Anderson's DCroads.net: Capital Beltway (I-495 and I-95)
 Washington's Circumferential Highway: Fighting Over the Capital Beltway - Ghosts of DC

95-4
95-4
95-4
95-4 Capital Beltway
495 Capital Beltway
4 Capital
Interstate 495
Interstate 495
Interstate 95-4
Interstate 95-4